Paulus Angelus is the Latin equivalent of "Paul Angel." The Latin name may refer to:
 Pal Engjëlli (1416–1470) Albanian bishop, earliest written record in the Albanian language
 Pal Dushi (Latin: Paulus Angelus Dussus or Dusius) (d.1455), Albanian bishop of Drisht then bishop of Shas. A member of the Engjëlli family. 
 Paulus Angelus, an Albanian priest in Venice in the 1520s. Author of commentary on Pico's Expositio in orationem dominicam 1524 and prophetic works
 Paolo Angelo Ballerini (Latin Paulus Angelus Ballerini) (1814–1897) Italian archbishop of Milan

References